Dicle Haber Ajansı, DIHA, is a "pro-Kurdish" news agency of Turkey. In March 2012 Reporters without Borders reported that 27 of its journalists were in prison. DIHA produces news reports on Turkish, Kurdish, and English

DIHA had several times difficulties with the Turkish authorities and several of its journalists were arrested. In March 2009, following the coverage of the Newroz festivals in Siirt, Abdurrahman Gök was arrested and charged with making propaganda on behalf of the Kurdistan Workers' Party.  

Between December 2015 and May 2016, 12 of its journalists were arrested. Turkish authorities have blocked access to the website 40 times; the website changes its address every time it is blocked. Following the 2016 Turkish coup d'état attempt, it was one of more than 150 news outlets shut down by the authorities.

See also
 Media of Turkey
 List of arrested journalists in Turkey

References

External links
DIHA website

Companies based in Istanbul
News agencies based in Turkey
Turkish companies established in 2002
Kurdish-language mass media
Mass media companies established in 2002
Kurdish-language websites